Winnie Adhiambo Apiyo (born c.1987) is a Kenyan electrical engineer who is employed as a Protection, Instrumentation and Control Engineer at Kenya Electricity Generating Company, the largest power producing company in Kenya, the largest economy n the East African Community.

Background and education
Apiyo was born in Kenya, circa 1987. She graduated with a Bachelor of Engineering degree in Electric & Electronic Engineering, awarded by Tver State Technical University, in Tver, Russia, in 2010.

She also has a Postgraduate Diploma in Geothermal Technology, obtained from the Iceland Energy Authority, in collaboration with the United Nations University, following a six-month study program of highly specialized studies in Geothermal technology and management. She was a member of the class of 2016. As of January 2019, she is enrolled in the Iceland School of Energy, at Reykjavik University, pursuing a Master of Science in Sustainable Energy Engineering.

Career
Apiyo serves as an electrical engineer at Kenya Electricity Generating Company. Her specialty in training and work is the planning, testing, and management of geothermal power stations. She has special interest, training and expertise in designing, maintaining and improving these energy infrastructure developments. In her native country of Kenya, she is one of a very small number of female electrical engineers, with special training and expertise in geothermal technology.

Achievements
In September 2018, Business Daily Africa, a Kenyan, English language, daily newspaper, named Winnie Apiyo among the "Top 40 Under 40 Women in Kenya in 2018".

In December 2017, Ms Apiyo received the 2017 Women in Energy Innovation Award at the 2nd Annual Women in Energy Conference, held from 13 until 14 December 2017, in Nairobi, Kenya's capital city. The award was in recognition of her work outlined in the attached abstract, named "Automatic Blockage of Grid Energy Back Feed Project".

See also
 Charity Wayua
 Gladys Ngetich
 Cynthia Wandia

References

External links
 About the Geothermal Training Program by the United Nations University & the Iceland Energy Authority
  Impact analysis of electric vehicles charging on the Icelandic power system: Abstract of Presentation of Winnie Adhiambo Apiyo, MSc Fellow in Sustainable Energy Engineering at Reykjavík University

1980s births
Living people
Kenyan engineers
Luo people
21st-century Kenyan women scientists
21st-century Kenyan scientists
Kenyan women engineers
Electrical engineers
Tver State University alumni
Reykjavík University alumni
21st-century women engineers